Tanggal 31 Ogos ("The Date of 31st of August") is a Malaysian patriotic and  national song. It is sung during the National Day celebrations throughout the nation. This song was covered by Sudirman. The lyrics were originally written and sung by Ahmad C.B., a singer-songwriter from Medan, Indonesia.

Lyrics

Malay

Tanggal tiga puluh satu
Bulan lapan lima puluh tujuh
Merdeka, Merdeka
Tetaplah merdeka
Ia pasti menjadi sejarah

Tanggal tiga puluh satu
Bulan lapan lima puluh tujuh
Hari yang mulia
Hari bahagia
Sambut dengan jiwa yang merdeka

Mari kita seluruh warganegara
Ramai-ramai menyambut hari merdeka
Merdeka!
Tiga satu bulan lapan lima puluh tujuh
Hari yang mulia, negaraku merdeka

Tanggal tiga puluh satu
Bulan lapan lima puluh tujuh
Merdeka, Merdeka
Tetaplah merdeka
Ia pasti menjadi sejarah

Tanggal tiga puluh satu
Bulan lapan lima puluh tujuh
Hari yang mulia
Hari bahagia
Sambut dengan jiwa yang merdeka

Mari kita seluruh warganegara
Ramai-ramai menyambut hari merdeka
Merdeka!
Tiga satu bulan lapan lima puluh tujuh
Hari yang mulia, negaraku merdeka

Mari kita seluruh warganegara
Ramai-ramai menyambut hari merdeka
Merdeka
Tiga satu bulan lapan lima puluh tujuh
Hari yang mulia negaraku mereka
Merdeka, Merdeka, Merdeka......
Merdeka!

English translation
On the date of the thirty-first day,
Of the eighth month of '57,
Independent, independent,
And it shall stay independent,
It must become history.

On the date of the thirty-first day,
Of the eighth month of 1957,
It is a glorious day,
A day of happiness,
Observed by free lives.

Let us, all the citizens,
All the crowds shall celebrate Independence Day.
Independence!
On 31st August, 1957,
This glorious day is when the nation is free!
Independence, Independence, Independence ... 
Independence!

Mungu

See also
Tanggal 31 mp3
Negaraku (National anthem)
Tegakkan Bendera Kita
List of Malaysian patriotic songs

Malaysian patriotic songs
Malaysian culture
Malay-language songs
Year of song missing